Cracco Peck is a restaurant in Milan, Italy.  The chef is Carlo Cracco. 

The chef Carlo Cracco is regarded by many as the supreme representative of Italian Cuisine.  His roots are in classic Italian cuisine.

As a young chef he worked for Alain Ducasse in Monaco, refining his culinary skills with the well defined touch of French cuisine. 
Cracco searches for new ratios and combinations of textures and flavours from everywhere in the world. Then he adds his genius sense for flavour ratios and combinations, whilst never forgetting his Italian roots.

His specialities include white truffle dishes and risottos.

The restaurant was voted 22nd best in the world in Restaurant (magazine) Top 50 2009.

External links
Review Website: 

Restaurants in Milan
Michelin Guide starred restaurants in Italy